Columba Blango may refer to:
Columba Blango (politician), Sierra Leonean politician and former decathlete
Columba Blango (paralympian), British parasports runner